The following lists events that happened in 1920 in El Salvador.

Incumbents
President: Jorge Meléndez 
Vice President: Alfonso Quiñónez Molina

Events

References

 
El Salvador
1920s in El Salvador
Years of the 20th century in El Salvador
El Salvador